"Cheryl" is a 1947 jazz standard written by Charlie Parker.

See also
List of jazz standards

References

1940s jazz standards
1947 songs
Compositions by Charlie Parker
Jazz compositions in C major